"Falling" is a 1986 song by American singer Melba Moore. The track was released as the third single following "A Little Bit More," her number one R&B song with Freddie Jackson. The song is noteworthy for Moore's vocal dynamics, including a high note that she holds for nearly 20 seconds, ranking among the longest sustained notes in recorded pop music. Just like Moore's previous single, "Falling" peaked at number one on Billboard's Hot R&B Singles chart, for one week.

Track listings and formats
US, 7-inch single
A. "Falling" (Radio edit) – 4:20
B. "Got To Have Your Love" – 5:09

US 12-inch Maxi-single
A. "Falling" (LP version) – 4:33
B. "Falling" (Edit) – 4:20

"Got To Have Your Love" (Written, Produced by Paul Laurence)

Personnel
Executive Producer – Beau Huggins
Producer – Gene McFadden

References

1986 singles
Melba Moore songs
1986 songs
Songs written by Franne Golde
Songs written by Gene McFadden